Sullia (also known as Sulya) is a town in the Dakshina Kannada district of the state of Karnataka, India.  It is the headquarters of the Sullia taluk. Sullia is located 300 kilometres West of the state capital Bengaluru.

History
A historical revolution took place during 1837 when a majority of the Gowdas, Bunts, Kydiyas, Adidravidas and other castes from Amara Sullia, Madikeri, Siddapura, Bhagamandala, Shanivarasanthe, Bellare, Puttur and Nandavara went and fought for freedom against the British.

Members of the Legislative Assembly

Demographics 
According to the 2011 census report, Hindus form the largest religious group in Sullia taluk (1,23,507 that is 85.04% of the taluk population). The number of Muslims is 19,556 (13.47% of the taluk population) and the number of Christians in the taluk is 2,076 (1.43%).

Religions in Sullia taluk

Languages in Sullia Taluk

Climate

Connectivity

Air 
The nearest airport to Sullia is Mangalore International Airport which is at a distance of 88 km. Flights are available to major Indian cities like Delhi, Bangalore, Hyderabad, Chennai, Mumbai and Middle East countries like Abu Dhabi, Bahrain, Dammam, Doha, Dubai–International, Kuwait, Muscat.

Railway 
The closest railway station to the city is Subrahmanya Road Railway Station (Station Code:SBHR) which is around 48 km via the fastest road.

See also 
 Jalsoor
 Ajjavara, Sulya
 Aletty

References

Cities and towns in Dakshina Kannada district